Allan Frederick Smith (December 19, 1911 – January 21, 1994) was a law professor and dean at the University of Michigan Law School.  He was an expert in personal property law and real estate transactions.

Before joining the University of Michigan faculty in 1947, he served for the Office of Price Administration and the United States Army.  Smith was interim president of the University of Michigan in 1979 after the resignation of Robben Wright Fleming.

Bibliography 
 1950 - Personal Life Insurance Trusts
 1951 - Basic Property Law
 1956 - The Law of Future Interests

References

External links 

 Tribute to Allan Smith by Robben Wright Fleming

1911 births
1994 deaths
Presidents of the University of Michigan
Deans of University of Michigan Law School
People from Nance County, Nebraska
University of Nebraska at Kearney alumni
University of Nebraska alumni
University of Michigan Law School alumni
University of Michigan faculty
20th-century American academics